Wilson Bigaud (29 January 1931 – 22 March 2010) was a Haitian painter. Born in Port-au-Prince, Bigaud first worked with clay before becoming a painter. At the International Exhibit in Washington, D.C., in 1950 Bigaud won second place for a painting entitled "Paradise". He also painted a mural in the Holy Trinity Cathedral of Port-au-Prince which depicts the Marriage at Cana. He was a member of the artist group founded by Hector Hyppolite.

References
 
 

1931 births
Haitian painters
Haitian male painters
2010 deaths
Naïve painters